Jere Elo (born March 7, 1992) is a Finnish professional ice hockey player. His is currently playing with Nes IK in the Norwegian First Division (Nor.1).

Elo made his Liiga debut playing with Espoo Blues during the 2013–14 Liiga season before he was loaned to Kiekko-Vantaa in the Finnish Mestis for the remainder of the season.

References

External links

1992 births
Living people
Ice hockey people from Helsinki
Espoo Blues players
Finnish ice hockey forwards
Kiekko-Vantaa players